Les Loges is a commune in the Seine-Maritime department in the Normandy region in northern France.

Geography

History
The name of the commune comes from the French word loge, meaning a cabin or shelter, or more usually in English, a hunting-lodge. 
The village is located almost at the end of the old Roman road linking Lillebonne with Étretat.  
William the Conqueror's granddaughter, the Empress Matilda gave this area to a Nicolas Estouteville in the twelfth century, to thank him for his support and loyalty. The seigneurie belonged to the family of Estouteville for eight centuries.
At the end of the nineteenth century, the Grimaldi family (of Monaco), who also bear the name of Estouteville, used the manorhouse as a residence resort.

Population

Places of interest
 The church of Notre-Dame, dating from the sixteenth century.
 The Manor d'Estouteville, originally eleventh century.
 The Town Hall, built in the nineteenth century.

See also
Communes of the Seine-Maritime department

References

External links

 Les Loges 76 (unofficial website) 

Communes of Seine-Maritime